King's Quest IV: The Perils of Rosella is a graphic adventure game developed and released by Sierra On-Line for the MS-DOS, Amiga, Apple II, Apple IIGS, and Atari ST computers in 1988. The player takes on the role of Princess Rosella, daughter of King Graham of Daventry (King's Quest I and King's Quest II) and the twin sister of Gwydion/Alexander (King's Quest III), who must save her father and a good fairy and destroy an evil witch. Critically acclaimed, it was one of the first PC games to support a sound card.

Gameplay 
King's Quest IV uses the Adventure Game Interpreter (AGI) and Sierra's Creative Interpreter (SCI) systems. This is the only chapter in the King's Quest series where the action takes place in real-time and within the allotted time limit, as the events of the game cover about 24 hours. Some activities must be completed during the day, while other puzzles can be solved only at night (the nightfall in the game happens either at 9 pm or at a certain point in the plot). The overall high difficulty of King's Quest III was toned down in King's Quest IV.

Plot 
Picking up immediately where King's Quest III: To Heir Is Human left off, as King Graham tosses his children his adventure's cap, he suffers a massive heart attack and is left on his death bed. The devastated Princess Rosella is contacted via the Magic Mirror by the good fairy Genesta in the faraway land of Tamir who reveals the existence of a magic fruit that can heal King Graham in exchange for Rosella helping Genesta. Rosella agrees and is teleported to the fairy kingdom of Tamir. The realm's ruler, Queen Genesta, reveals that her archenemy, the evil fairy Lolotte, has stolen her talisman without which Genesta will die in twenty-four hours. Additionally, without the talisman, Genesta lacks the power to return Rosella to Daventry. Rosella agrees to undertake a quest for both the talisman and the magic fruit and goes out undercover, dressed as a peasant girl.

Rosella manages to find the fruit, traversing a dangerous underground passage and swamp, but is captured in Queen Lolotte's perilous mountains and imprisoned in her castle. The witch demands that Rosella undertake three tasks for her in order for Rosella to earn her freedom and a big reward. Rosella reluctantly agrees and captures a unicorn, steals the golden hen and recovers Pandora's Box for Lolotte who intends to use the items to increase her evil power and influence. Lolotte reveals that her hideous and deformed son Edgar has fallen in love with Rosella and she intends for them to marry, trapping Rosella and condemning King Graham and Genesta to death. However, a sympathetic Edgar helps Rosella escape and she slays Lolotte with Cupid's bow. Rosella recovers the talisman, the hen and Pandora's Box and rescues the unicorn. In order to keep Pandora's Box from being used for evil again, Rosella returns it to its tomb and seals the entrance so that no one else can ever enter.

Rosella returns the talisman and the hen to Genesta, saving her life. As a reward for his help and kindness, Genesta transforms Edgar into a handsome young man, but Rosella rejects Edgar's marriage proposal although she expresses hope that they will meet again someday. Rosella is teleported back to Daventry where the fruit heals King Graham, much to the joy of his family.

Although Rosella's primary quest is to retrieve the magic fruit needed to save King Graham, it is possible to return to Daventry without completing this task, but this leads to a tragic alternate ending to the game where Rosella returns to Daventry in time to witness her father passing away instead of saving his life. A second alternate ending exists where if Rosella is caught after escaping from her room, she will be forced to marry Edgar and spend the rest of her life in Tamir. Winning the game will not resolve all storylines, although that will be the goal in the sequels.

Development and release 
With the SCI engine, Sierra dropped disk-based copy protection schemes in favor of requiring the user to enter a word from the manual, as the new-generation games were designed primarily to be installed and run from a hard disk. King's Quest IV was the first commercially released game for IBM PC compatibles to support sound cards instead of only the standard built-in speaker. In addition to the familiar PC speaker and Tandy sound, it could utilize AdLib , Disney Sound Source, IBM Music Feature Card, or Roland boards. The new SCI engine allowed the game's designers to incorporate an orchestrated musical score along with more complex sound effects, a previously unattainable feat. To ensure an immersive soundtrack, composer William Goldstein was hired to write the game's musical score, totaling over 75 short music pieces.

The series' author Roberta Williams wrote in the notes to the King's Quest Collection Series: "Before King's Quest IV was released, word leaked out that Graham would have a heart attack and might die. Fans were upset enough to write in, asking to save Graham. I wanted King's Quest IV to have some pressure applied to you: a timed game, taking place over a 24-hour period, so you roam around during the day and eventually it turns to night. I don't remember other games using the same scenes at night; it looked creepy". With a female protagonist and more colorful graphics than in her earlier games, she attempted to appeal more specifically to female demographics. As the game's aspect that satisfied her most, she said: "I like the heroine, Rosella. I guess because she's a part of me that's coming out. I really identified with her. Sometimes she's delicate, but she's strong, knows what she wants, she's not afraid to do what she has to do. She's courageous. It was fun for me to do a female character".

The game was simultaneously produced and published in the AGI and SCI engines. The AGI engine was used in all earlier Sierra adventure games, the SCI in all later ones. SCI supported higher-resolution graphics (320×200 resolution versus 160×200), more sophisticated animation, mouse, and sound card support. Some older features like CGA composite mode and PCjr support were removed. Memory requirements for SCI games were thus double those of AGI games (512 kB vs 256k). The new engine was designed for then-current IBM-compatible hardware (i.e. 8–16 MHz 286 or 386 machines with EGA or VGA graphics and a hard disk) and ran poorly on older 8086 computers. The game was previewed at the Consumer Electronics Show on June 4, 1988.

King's Quest IV was the only native-mode SCI game to also have an AGI version (some games originally made with the AGI engine like the original King's Quest were released in updated SCI versions). This was done mostly as a fall-back measure because the SCI engine was new and unproven, and also for the large existing user base of 8086 machines. However, only a quite small number of copies were sold. It was discontinued within a few months of the game's August 1988 release. The two games are identical in gameplay, except that the SCI version was updated with some additional parser responses. The AGI version 2.0 contains the "beam me" Easter egg, which transported Rosella to a Star Trek-esque room with all of the development team present (this Easter egg is not present in any SCI version). A version identical to the AGI version was released on the Apple IIGS with improved music and effects (over the MS-DOS AGI counterpart); the IIGS port does not use the SCI engine for performance reasons.

Reception 
King's Quest IV sold 100,000 copies in its first two weeks. According to Sierra On-Line, combined sales of the King's Quest series surpassed 3.8 million units by the end of March 1996. By November 2000, PC Data reported that King's Quest IVs sales in the United States alone had reached between 300,000 and 400,000 units. GameSpot's staff wrote that the game "marked a dramatic increase in the series' commercial success".

King's Quest IV was very well received by the trade press, including being awarded review scores of 309/400 from ACE, 79% from Amiga Action, 81% from Amiga Computing, 85% from Commodore User, 91% from Computer & Video Games, 85% from CU Amiga, 9/10 from Datormagazin, 90% from The Games Machine (Italia), 13/15 from Tilt, and 79% from Zzap!. It was also selected as "Best Adventure Game of 1988" by the Software Publishers Association.

Scorpia of Computer Gaming World reviewed King's Quest IV, noting the beautiful graphics, but also mentioning the game ran slowly if the screen contained animations. She described the game's puzzles as "uneven", but considered the presentation as cinematic in quality. David Stanton of Compute! praised the graphics and sound of the IBM PC version, including its support of VGA and sound cards such as AdLib and Roland MT-32, and concluded that "King's Quest IV sets a gaming standard others will be hard-pressed to match, much less surpass", describing the game's soundtrack as "40 minutes of the best sound available on any computer disk anywhere". Page 6s John Sweeney wrote the game was "undoubtedly excellent", but personally he preferred King's Quest III.

In 2009, Atomic named King's Quest IV one of the "50 Games to Play Before You Die". The magazine's Ben Hardwidge called it "a classic". IGN's Kosta Andreadis wrote in 2014: "The Perils of Rosella stands the test of time despite its shortcomings (and you can buy it on GOG.com), for above all providing a memorable and at times thrilling adventure, on top of being one of the first games to ever feature both a female protagonist as well as sound card support".

References

External links 
 
 
 King's Quest IV at the Sierra Chest

1988 video games
Adventure games
Point-and-click adventure games
1980s interactive fiction
Amiga games
Apple IIGS games
Atari ST games
DOS games
King's Quest
Sierra Entertainment games
ScummVM-supported games
Video games featuring female protagonists
Video games about witchcraft
Games commercially released with DOSBox
Fantasy video games
Video games developed in the United States